The 1968 United States Senate election in Washington was held on November 5, 1968. Incumbent Democratic U.S. Senator Warren Magnuson won a fifth term in office, defeating Republican State Senator Jack Metcalf.

Blanket primary
The blanket primary was held on September 17, 1968.

Candidates

Democratic
Arthur C. DeWitt, unsuccessful candidate for Democratic nomination for U.S. Senate in 1964
Warren G. Magnuson, incumbent United States Senator

Republican
Harvey L. Cole
Roy R. Fait
Jack Metcalf, State Senator
Ralph O. Westlake

Results

General election

Candidates
 Warren Magnuson, Democratic, incumbent U.S. Senator
 Jack Metcalf, Republican, State Senator
 Irwin R. Hogenauer, New Party, peace activist
 Debbie Leonard, Socialist Workers

Results

See also 
 1968 United States Senate elections

References

Bibliography
 
 

1968
United States Senate
Washington